Janice Parker (born 13 November 1937) is an Australian former cricket player.
Parker played five tests for the Australia national women's cricket team.

References

1937 births
Australia women Test cricketers
Living people